Olszanowski's black-kneed katydid (Aprosphylus olszanowskii) is a species of katydid that is endemic to the Western Cape and Northern Cape provinces of South Africa. It is mostly found in fynbos, but it can also be found in succulent and Nama Karoo biomes. Most records are from between 700 and 1,000 m.

References

Tettigoniidae
Endemic insects of South Africa
Insects described in 1994